The Adult Residential Colleges Association (ARCA) was a group of 27 residential colleges in the United Kingdom. The association was based in Felixstowe, Suffolk, England.

ARCA colleges specialized in short-stay residential adult education courses for the general public. Many were run by local authorities, whilst others were operated by charitable trusts or similar organizations.

Each college published its own programme of weekend, midweek and day courses, summer schools and courses leading to recognized qualifications. Most were offered just for the enjoyment of learning rather than for formal credit. Academic qualifications were not required of those who enrolled.

Associated colleges
 Anglia Leisure Learning in Suffolk
 Alston Hall in Longridge, Lancashire
 Belstead House in Ipswich, Suffolk
 Benslow Music Trust in Hitchin, Hertfordshire
 Braziers Park in Wallingford, Oxfordshire
 Burton Manor in Burton, Cheshire
 Debden House in Loughton, Essex
 Denman College in Marcham, Oxfordshire
 Dillington House in Whitelackington, Somerset
 Farncombe Estate Centre in Broadway, Worcestershire
 Hawkwood College in Stroud, Gloucestershire
 Higham Hall in Cockermouth, Cumbria
 Knuston Hall in Irchester, Northamptonshire
 Lancashire College in Chorley, Lancashire
 Missenden Abbey in Great Missenden, Buckinghamshire
 Plas Tan y Bwlch in Blaenau Ffestiniog, Gwynedd
 Wedgwood Memorial College in Barlaston, Staffordshire
 West Dean College in West Dean, West Sussex
 Westhope Craft College in Craven Arms, Shropshire

External links
 ARCA website
 Addresses of colleges

Further education colleges in England
Adult education in the United Kingdom